Movin' On is an album by organist Reuben Wilson which was recorded in 2006 and released on the Savant label.

Reception

In his review on Allmusic, Scott Yanow states "The music is reminiscent of the late '60s with catchy grooves, long vamps and some heated solos .... The mixture of basic originals and R&B covers works well and even if the program is not all that memorable, the good-time music will please fans of the idiom". In JazzTimes, Bill Milkowski called the album a "largely smooth-jazz offering" and said "the playing here is purely pedestrian ... Groove-mongers may dig this, but serious B3 mavens may want to pass"

Track listing 
All compositions by Reuben Wilson except where noted
 "Movin' On" (J. Cunningham, C. Carson Parks) – 4:11
 "Slick Willie" – 4:58
 "Waita Minute" – 7:14
 "Miss Mansfield" (G. Samuels) – 5:12
 "Funk Farm" (Grant Green Jr., Reuben Wilson) – 7:03
 "Watch Me Fly" – 4:26
 "Feel Free" – 4:59
 "What You Won't Do for Love" (Bobby Caldwell, Alfons Kettner) – 4:13
 "Caught Up in the Rapture" (Gary Glenn, Dianne Quander) – 4:43

Personnel 
Reuben Wilson – Hammond B-3 
Robert Chaseman – tenor saxophone (tracks 1, 3, 5 & 8)
Grant Green Jr. – guitar, vocals
Wilbur Bascomb – bass (tracks 1, 2, 4, 6 & 9)
Shawn Hill (tracks 1, 2, 4, 6 & 9), J.T. Lewis (tracks 3, 5, 7 & 8) – drums

References 

Reuben Wilson albums
2006 albums
Savant Records albums